Dietmar "Didi" Constantini (born 30 May 1955) is an Austrian football manager and former player.

He was appointed as head coach of the Austria national team in March 2009 and was replaced by Marcel Koller in October 2011.

In his career as club manager, he coached FC Kärnten, FC Pasching, and Austria Vienna, amongst others.

Coaching record

References

External links

1955 births
Living people
Sportspeople from Innsbruck
Footballers from Tyrol (state)
Austrian footballers
Association football central defenders
Association football midfielders
FC Wacker Innsbruck players
LASK players
Austrian football managers
Austria national football team managers
LASK managers
FC Admira Wacker Mödling managers
FC Tirol Innsbruck managers
FK Austria Wien managers
FC Kärnten managers
1. FSV Mainz 05 managers
Austrian people of Italian descent
Austrian expatriate footballers
Austrian expatriate football managers
Austrian expatriate sportspeople in Greece
Expatriate footballers in Greece
Austrian expatriate sportspeople in Germany
Expatriate football managers in Germany